Françoise Louise de La Vallière, Duchess of La Vallière and Vaujours, born Françoise Louise de La Baume Le Blanc de La Vallière, Mademoiselle de La Vallière (6 August 1644 – 7 June 1710) was a French noblewoman and the first mistress of Louis XIV of France from 1661 to 1667. She was created suo jure Duchess of La Vallière and Duchess of Vaujours. After leaving the royal court, Louise dedicated her life to religion, becoming a nun in 1674.

Ancestry and early life (1644–1661) 
Françoise Louise de La Baume Le Blanc de La Vallière, Mademoiselle de La Vallière was born on 6 August 1644 at the Hôtel de la Crouzille (also known as Hôtel de la Vallière) in Tours, Kingdom of France as the daughter of military officer Laurent de La Baume Le Blanc, Lord of La Vallière and his wife, born Françoise Le Prévost, widow of a councillor of the parlement. The La Blaume Le Blanc family had distungished itself in military service to the crown, while the Le Prévosts had served the throne with their legal knowledge for generations. At the time of her birth, her father was the governor of the Castle of Amboise, where she spent her first years, also spending time in her family's Castle of La Vallière in Reugny. During these years, she was educated by her aunts, Ursuline nuns Élisabeth and Charlotte in reading, grammar, musical composition and public speaking.

Following her father's death, La Vallière's mother married Jacques de Courtavel, Marquess of Saint-Rémy, butler of the exiled Gaston, Duke of Orléans (uncle of Louis XIV, known as "Monsieur", 1608–1660). La Vallière served as a lady's companion to the duke's three younger daughters, Princesses Marguerite-Louise (1645–1721), Élisabeth-Marguerite "Isabelle" (1646–1696), and Françoise-Madeleine (1648–1664), being educated with them in painting, music, etiquette, equitation, literature and philosophy by the duke's first almoner, Armand Jean le Bouthillier de Rancé, who went on to found the Order of Cistercians of the Strict Observance ("Trappists"). After the death of the Duke of Orléans, his widow Marguerite (1615–1672) moved with her daughters to the Luxembourg Palace, Paris and took then-sixteen-year-old La Vallière with them.

Life at the royal court (1661–1671) 
Through the influence of a distant relative, Madame de Choisy (born Jeanne-Olympe Hurault de L'Hospital; 1604–1669) Mademoiselle de La Vallière was named maid of honour to Henrietta (1644–1670), the new Duchess of Orléans, wife of Louis XIV's brother Philippe I, Duke of Orléans (1640–1701) and moved to her home, the Tuileries Palace. Henrietta, known as "Madame" joined the court at Fontainebleau in 1661,  where La Vallière likely first met her future lover, Louis XIV, King of France (1638–1715). She served the duchess together with Françoise de Rochechouart de Mortemart, Mademoiselle de Tonnay-Charente (1640–1707), the future Madame de Montespan.

Louis XIV's mistress (1661–1667) 

A close relationship soon formed between the king and Madame, which concerned the Queen Dowager, Anne (1601–1666). In order to counter rumours, they allegedly decided that he should court other women as a front, for which Madame herself selected three young ladies, including La Vallière. She spent only two months in Fontainebleau before becoming the king's mistress. According to one version of the events, she knew nothing of her part in a ploy to avert a scandal, delightfully believing that the monarch's feelings for her were sincere. Apart from her skills in various arts and sports, it was La Vallière's innocence and sincerity that captured the king: one source states that he fell in love with her after, upon their first meeting, she exclaimed "Ah! if he was not the King...".Fraser, Antonia, Love and Louis XIV, Anchor Books, 2006, pp. 70–71.

This was Mademoiselle de La Vallière's first relationship. She was reportedly an innocent, religious girl who did not behave flirtatiously or acted on self-interest during the romance. She was not extravagant, nor was she interested in the wealth or the titles she could receive. from her situation. Antonia Fraser writes that she was a "secret lover not a maîtresse-en-titre like Barbara Villiers." Nicolas Fouquet's curiosity in the affair was one of the causes of his disgrace, for, when he bribed Louise, the king mistakenly thought that Fouquet was attempting to take her as a lover.[clarification needed] The affair, although discreet, quickly became public, angering the clergy, including celebrated orator and future Bishop of Meaux, Jacques-Bénigne Bossuet (1627–1704), as well as many religiously devoted people in the court. It also invoked the bitter sarcasm of Madame. Wishing to avoid scandal and a confrontation with his mother, the king moved La Vallière to a hunting lodge in the forest near Versailles, not far from Saint-Germain-en-Laye.

In February 1662, the couple had a conflict: upon direct questioning by the king, La Vallière refused to tell him about the alleged affair between the Duchess of Orléans and Armand de Gramont, Count of Guiche (1637–1673).  Around the same time, Bossuet delivered a series of Lenten sermons condemning the immoral activities of the king through the example of David's adultery, which troubled the pious girl's conscience, and she fled to a convent in Chaillot. Meanwhile, her enemies, lead by the Countess of Soissons, born Olympia Mancini conspired to bring La Vallière down by bringing the affair to the attention of Queen Maria Theresa (1638–1683).

During her first pregnancy in 1663, La Vallière was removed from the service of the Duchess of Orléans and sent to live in the Palais-Royal, where, on 19 December 1663, she gave birth to a son, Charles (1663–1665). He was taken immediately and secretly to Saint-Leu and entrusted to the care of two faithful servants of Chief Minister Jean-Baptiste Colbert (1619–1683). Despite the attempts of Dr Boucher, who was present at the birth and tried to make the transfer as secret as possible, the story quickly spread through Paris. The public scorn at the Midnight Mass on 24 December was so great that La Vallière escaped from the church.

In 1664, Louis XIV hosted a multi-day performance and party, called Les Plaisirs de l’Île enchantée ("The Pleasures of the Enchanted Island") in the hunting lodge where his mistress lived. During the festivities, Molière (1622–1673) presented two new plays, La Princesse d'Élide (The Princess of Elid) and Le Tartuffe, ou l'Imposteur (Tartuffe, or The Impostor/Hypocrite) with the musical arrangements of Jean-Baptiste Lully (1632–1687). Queen Maria Theresa and the dowager queen were the official dedicators, while La Vallière was the unofficial dedicatee, leading to court gossip.[clarification needed]  This only worsened when she received the domain of Carrières-sur-Seine, and started building a castle there, with gardens designed by André Le Nôtre (1613–1700), the royal landscape architect.

In 1665, the king had two affairs beside the one with La Vallière: he was temporarily involved with Bonne de Pons d'Heudicourt (1644–1709), whose family quickly had her removed from the court, then with the Princess of Monaco, born Catherine Charlotte de Gramont (1639–1678). After the death of his mother in 1666, Louis XIV started to publicly display his affair, which greatly displeased La Vallière. Within a week of the dowager queen's death, La Vallière had to appear at mass next to the queen. Ashamed, she treated Maria Theresa with humility and respect.

The end of the royal affair and later life at the royal court (1666–1669) 

Around the time of the death of the queen dowager, the former Mademoiselle de Tonnay-Charente, now the Marquise of Montespan returned to the service of the Duchess of Orléans, which she left because of her marriage in 1663. Now a lady-in-waiting, she quickly established herself as the reigning beauty of the court. Enamoured, the king sought to take her as his new mistress.

In May 1667, before going on a military campaign to Flanders, the king legitimised their only living child, Marie-Anne (1666–1739). Their three eldest children, Charles (1663–1665), Philippe (1665–1666), and Louis (1665–1666) had already died by this time. Marie-Anne thus became a fille legitimée de France ("legitimised daughter of France"), could use the surname de Bourbon and received the title Mademoiselle de Blois. On the same day, he created his mistress Duchess of La Vallière and Duchess of Vaujours. As a duchess, La Vallière had the right to sit on a taboret in the presence of the queen, which was a highly prized privilege. However, La Vallière was not impressed, saying that the title resembled a present given to a servant when he retired. Affirming this, Louis XIV commented that legitimising their daughter and the gifts to La Vallière "matched the affection he had had for her for six years".

When the king left for the campaign, La Vallière, again pregnant, was ordered to stay at the court. Worrying for the king and maybe feeling jealous, she travelled to the battlefield without permission and threw herself at his feet, sobbing uncontrollably. Infuriated, Louis forced her to return home immediately. Madame de Montespan was the first to denounce her for the scandal. The king made La Vallière share an apartment with Montespan at the Tuileries Palace, as the latter's husband was very uncomfortable with his wife's affair. During this time, a devastated La Vallière wrote a poem, titled Sonnet to the King.

Five months after the battlefield scandal, on 2 October 1667, La Vallière gave birth to her fifth and last child, Louis (1667–1683), who would later be legitimised. Hoping to win back the heart of the king, La Vallière accepted all the humiliations inflicted upon her by the new situation: Montespan demanded that she assist her with her toilette, and the king would often demand the two rivals to travel in the carriage of the queen on journeys. Her tactic was unsuccessful: the king did not return to her, nor did he end his other affairs.

In 1669, when, effectively, their relationship had long since ended, their son was legitimised, created Count of Vermandois, and given the post of Admiral of France. As he was only 2 years old, the king retained his authority over the navy. Around the same time, at the end of March 1669, Madame de Montespan gave birth to her first child by the king, a daughter (1669–1672). La Vallière served as the newborn daughter's godmother, who was named Louise-Françoise after her.

The strain of being forced to live with her former lover and his current mistress took its toll on La Vallière: she lost weight and became increasingly pale and exhausted. In 1670, after a nearly fatal, long illness (which, according to some sources, was the result of a miscarriage), she turned to religion, writing her Réflexions sur la miséricorde de Dieu ("Reflections on the Mercy of God"). She remained at court for two more years, trying to lead an exemplary life in the hope of inspiring others. Her love for the king was not yet dead: she admitted that she was not "dead to her passions, while I feel them live more strongly than ever in what I love more than myself".

Later life (1671–1710) 
Following the advice of Jesuit preacher Louis Bourdaloue (1632–1704), supported Bossuet and Bernardin Gigault de Bellefond, Marquis de Bellefonds (1630–1694), head of the Maison du Roi, she decided to leave the court and enter the Carmelite convent in the Faubourg Saint-Jacques part of Paris, later known as Notre-Dame-des-Champs. Even though the Carmelites followed very strict rules, La Vallière rejected the option of being placed in a more relaxed order. She first attempted to leave in 1671, without the king's permission, fleeing to the Convent of the Visitandines of Chaillot.

Madamde de Montespan wanted La Vallière to return so that her own affair with the king could remain hidden. He urged the king to publicly recognise his daughter with La Vallière as Mademoiselle de Blois. She asked her confidant and governess of her children, Madame Scarron (the future Madame de Maintenon, born Françoise d'Aubigné; 1635–1719) to detail to La Vallière the suffering she would be exposed to at a Carmelite convent, as well as the court scandal that her decision would provoke. Scarron highlighted that she would eventually be forbidden from wearing her custom-made shoes that allowed her to walk without a limp, as one of her legs was shorter than the other. "When I shall be suffering at the convent", Louise replied, ""I shall only have to remember what they made me suffer here, and all the pain shall seem light to me."

As a Carmelite nun (1675–1710) 
 All of the attempts at dissuading her were in vain and, in 1674, La Vallière was finally permitted to enter the Carmelite convent in the Faubourg Saint-Jacques. The day she left the court she threw herself at the feet of the queen, begging forgiveness, saying that "My crimes were public, my repentance must be public, too." One year later, on 3 June 1675, La Vallière took her perpetual vows under the name Louise de la Miséricorde ("Louise of Mercy"), and accepted the black veil from the queen herself, who kissed and blessed her.

In her absence, the new Duchess of Orléans, born Princess Elizabeth Charlotte "Liselotte" of the Palatinate, known as Madame Palatine, took care of the education of her son Louis. He died on his first military campaign at the age of 16, in 1683, while in exile in Flanders for his involvement with a secret group of young aristocrats practicing what was then called "le vice italien", homosexuality. His sister and aunt were greatly affected by his death, while his father did not shed a tear. His mother, in reference to the adultery of her son's conception, said upon receiving the news, "I ought to weep for his birth far more than [for] his death."

Queen Maria Theresia, the Duchess of Orléans, Bishop Bossuet, and Marie de Rabutin-Chantal, Marquise de Sévigné (1626–1696) had a habit of visiting Louise at the convent for spiritual consolation and repose. Later in life, Madame de Montespan herself also went to her for advice on a pious life. Louise forgave her and counselled her on the mysteries of divine grace.

Sister Louise de la Miséricordie died on 6 June 1710, at the age of 65, after 36 years of religious life, and was buried in the cemetery of her convent. Her titles and possessions were inherited by her only surviving child, Marie-Anne, by then Princess Dowager of Conti.

Physical appearance 
Although she was never described as a striking beauty or naturally brilliant, Louise had qualities that attracted attention: she was discreet, modest and had blonde hair and soft blue eyes. She was afflicted with a limp as one of her legs was shorter than the other, but she wore custom-made shoes and managed to be an accomplished and graceful rider and dancer. At the age of 17, she reportedly "had an exquisite complexion, blond hair, blue eyes, a sweet smile . . . [and] an expression [at] once tender and modest."

Issue 
Louise de la Vallière had five children by Louis XIV, two of whom survived infancy:
 Charles de La Baume Le Blanc (19 December 1663 – 15 July 1665), died in infancy and was never legitimised;
 Philippe de La Baume Le Blanc (7 January 1665 – 1666), died in infancy and was never legitimised;
 Louis de La Baume Le Blanc (27 December 1665 – 1666), died in infancy and was never legitimised;
 Marie-Anne de Bourbon, Légitimée de France (2 October 1666 – 3 May 1739); known as Mademoiselle de Blois after her legitimation. She married Louis Armand I, Prince of Conti (1661–1685) and had no issue. She inherited the title of Duchess of La Vallière from her mother;
 Louis de Bourbon, Count of Vermandois (2 October 1667 – 18 November 1683); died at the age of 16 in exile, during his first military campaign, and had no issue.

Legacy and appearances in popular culture

 The term lavalier, meaning a jeweled pendant necklace, comes from her name (or possibly from that of Ève Lavallière). In French, a lavallière is a neck tie tied to form a bow at the front of the neck (reminiscent of a pussy bow), which was popular in the 19th century;
 La Vallière's book Réflexions sur la miséricorde de Dieu ("Reflections on the Mercy of God) were printed in 1767, and in again in 1860 as Réflexions, lettres et sermons, by M. P. Clement;
 Letitia Elizabeth Landon's poetical illustration, Louise, Duchess of La Valliere, to an engraving of a painting by Edmund Thomas Parris, was published in 1838.
 Louise de la Vallière by Maria McIntosh (1854) is her earliest known fictionalised portrayal in English; 
 She is one of the main characters in Alexandre Dumas's novel The Vicomte de Bragelonne, the second sequel to The Three Musketeers. Dumas makes her the fiancée of the fictional titular character, son of the musketeer Athos. Some editions break the novel up in several books, one of which is titled Louise de la Vallière.
 In 1922, a German silent film titled Louise de Lavallière was made about her life;
 Marcelle Vioux wrote a 1938 novel about her titled Louise de La Valliere;
 Sandra Gulland wrote a historical novel featuring her, titled Mistress of the Sun, published in 2008;
Karleen Koen's 2011 novel Before Versailles is told from Louise de la Vallière's point of view;
 Joan Sanders published a biography of Louise in 1959 titled La Petite : Louise de la Vallière ("The Little: Louise de la Vallière");
 Louise Françoise le Blanc de la Vallière, the main female character of The Familiar of Zero, was named after her;
 Christina Rossetti's poem Sœur Louise de la Miséricorde is presumed to be about the Duchess of La Vallière.

Footnotes

References

Historia magazine n°o 459, March 1985 

1644 births
1710 deaths
People from Tours, France
Dukes of La Vallière
17th-century peers of France
Peers created by Louis XIV
Mistresses of Louis XIV
La Valliere, Duchess of, Louise
Discalced Carmelite nuns
17th-century French women writers
18th-century French women writers
18th-century French writers
17th-century French nuns
French autobiographers
Women autobiographers
18th-century French nuns